Gore Obsessed is the eighth studio album by American death metal band Cannibal Corpse, released on February 26, 2002 by Metal Blade Records.

The Japanese version of the album includes "Compelled to Lacerate" as a live bonus track.

Track listing

Credits 
Writing, performance and production credits are adapted from the album liner notes.

Personnel 
Cannibal Corpse
 George "Corpsegrinder" Fisher – vocals
 Pat O'Brien – lead guitar
 Jack Owen – rhythm guitar
 Alex Webster – bass
 Paul Mazurkiewicz – drums

Production
 Neil Kernon – production, mixing
 Cannibal Corpse – production
 Justin Leeah – engineering
 Ramon Breton – mastering

Artwork and design
 Vincent Locke – cover art
 Alex McKnight – photography

Studios 
 Sonic Ranch, Tornillo, TX, US – recording
 Oceanview Digital Mastering – mastering

Charts

References

External links 
 
 Gore Obsessed at Metal Blade Records

2002 albums
Albums produced by Neil Kernon
Cannibal Corpse albums
Metal Blade Records albums
Albums recorded at Sonic Ranch